Lena Zavaroni And Her Music is the sixth album by Scottish singer Lena Zavaroni, released in 1979 by Galaxy Records. It was manufactured and distributed by CBS Records.

Track listing 
 "I Am"
 "You Keep Me Dancing" (Denny Randell, Sandy Linzer)
 "Until The Night"
 "Back in Time"
 "Then Again You're Gonna Wake Up"
 "Somebody Should Have Told Me"
 "Dancing Free"
 "Dance All Night"
 "I Don't Need a Doctor" (Ashford and Simpson))
 "Spotlight" (Gerry Goffin)

Personnel 
 Lena Zavaroni – vocals

References

1979 albums
Lena Zavaroni albums